Sports Bar is a sketch-comedy show that aired in first-run syndication from 1997 to 1998. The series featured members of the Second City improvisational comedy troupe out of Chicago. This was the first television series since the end of SCTV in 1984, where creative control has been so firmly in the hands of the troupe. The Sports Bar was taped at WTTW's Chicago Production Center, who was a part owner of the program.

Format
The series follows the lives of the regulars at a sports bar, who serve as a leaping-off point for satirizing the world of sports, leisure and American culture as a whole. The TV sets in the bar allowed the show to offer up commercial parodies and snippets of newscasts.

Cast
Maria Corell	...	 Regular Performer
John Farley	...	 Regular Performer
Kevin P. Farley	...	 Regular Performer
Scot Fedderly	...	 Patron
Bruce Green	...	 Guest Performer
Soren McCarthy	...	 Ensemble Cast (1998)
Greg Mills	...	 Regular Performer (1997)
Monte	...	 Patron
David Pompeii	...	 Regular Performer
Tami Sagher	...	 Regular Performer
Al Samuels	...	 Regular Performer
Rich Talarico	...	 Regular Performer
Elvis Winterbottom	...	 Guest Performer (1998) (uncredited)

See also
List of fictional bars and pubs

References

External links
 
TV Production image
TV Production image #2

1997 American television series debuts
1998 American television series endings
1990s American sketch comedy television series
1990s American satirical television series
First-run syndicated television programs in the United States
English-language television shows
The Second City
1990s American workplace comedy television series
Fictional drinking establishments